Raúl Arseno Casado (July 27, 1927 – July 20, 2010) was the Catholic archbishop of the Roman Catholic Archdiocese of Tucumán, Argentina.

Ordained to the priesthood December 20, 1952, he was named bishop on May 14, 1975 and was ordained on August 16, 1975 serving in several dioceses.

Notes

 Murió monseñor Arsenio Raúl Casado

20th-century Roman Catholic archbishops in Argentina
1927 births
2010 deaths
Roman Catholic bishops of Jujuy
Roman Catholic bishops of Salta
Roman Catholic archbishops of Tucumán